Ed Brigadier (October 16, 1949 – February 26, 2012) was an American actor immortalized as the gruesome motorcycle-riding title character in the cult slasher film, Dr. Chopper (2005). Brigadier made many other appearances in film and television on such shows as House, Nip/Tuck, Scrubs, Alias, How I Met Your Mother and Malcolm in the Middle. He appeared many times on The History Channel, most memorably as Philippe de Rigaud Vaudreuil in the miniseries The War That Made America - The Story of the French and Indian War, and acted on stage in such plays as The Imaginary Invalid, A Servant of Two Masters, and A Midsummer Night's Dream.

Military work 
In the 1980s, Brigadier spent time in Berlin, Germany working for the U.S. Army Recreation Services as a director for the community theater there. He performed in and directed Arsenic and Old Lace while there.

Death 
Brigadier died as a result of suicide.

Filmography

Film

Television

References

External links
 
 

1949 births
American male film actors
2012 deaths
Male actors from Cleveland